Topalović is a Serbo-Croatian surname, derived from topal, a Turkism meaning "lame, cripple". It is borne by ethnic Serbs, ethnic Bosniaks and ethnic Croats. It may refer to:

Cooper Woods-Topalovic (born 2000), Australian freestyle skier
Enes Topalović (born 1963), Bosnian poet
Đorđe Topalović (born 1977), Serbian retired footballer
Mušan Topalović (1957–1993), Bosnian army commander
Mato Topalović (1812-1862), Croatian poet
Petar Topalović (1840-1891), Serbian general, minister of defense, minister of construction and manager of the Military Academy
Slobodan Topalović (1952-1994), Serbian retired footballer
Vjenceslav Topalović (born 1932), Croatian publicist
Vjenceslav Topalović (born 1932), Croatian scientist, researcher and writer of Croatian history
Živko Topalović (1886–1972), Yugoslav socialist politician
Željko Topalović (born 1972), Serbian hotelier and former basketball player

Bosnian surnames
Serbian surnames